The Proximus blind snake or the woodland blind snake (Anilios proximus) is a species of snake in the Typhlopidae family that is native to eastern Australia.

Description
It has an average length of 50cm, but can reach 75cm. It is dark brown and glossy in appearance with very small eyes, bluntly trilobed snout, 20 mid body scales and no noticeable head. They can often be mistaken for earthworms.

Distribution
It is found in eastern Queensland, New South Wales, northern Victoria and eastern South Australia. Predominately nocturnal and non-venomous, it is a burrowing snake which spends most of its life beneath leaf litter or underground. It is rarely seen in daytime, but would make incidental appearances after heavy rainfall or warm moist nights using rocks and debris for shelter.

Feeding
It mostly feeds on termites, larvae and pupae of ants, and small insects.

References

Anilios
Reptiles described in 1893
Snakes of Australia